Banguingui, officially the Municipality of Banguingui (Tausūg: Kawman sin Banguingui), is a 4th class municipality in the province of Sulu, Philippines. According to the 2020 census, it has a population of 35,616 people.

From its original name Tongkil, it was renamed Banguingui on January 29, 1999, by virtue of Muslim Mindanao Autonomy Act No. 71 of the Autonomous Region in Muslim Mindanao in honor of the dominant Banguingui tribe of the municipality. It was inaugurated only on January 29, 2006.

Geography

Barangays
Tongkil is politically subdivided into 14 barangays.

Bakkaan
Bangalaw
Danao
Dungon
Kahikukuk
Luuk (Poblacion)
North Paarol
Sigumbal
South Paarol
Tabialan
Tainga-Bakkao
Tambun-bun
Tattalan
Tinutungan

Climate

Demographics

Economy

References

External links
Banguingui Profile at PhilAtlas.com
[ Philippine Standard Geographic Code]
Banguingui Profile at the DTI Cities and Municipalities Competitive Index
Philippine Census Information
Local Governance Performance Management System

Municipalities of Sulu
Island municipalities in the Philippines